Salma Shaheen Butt (born 1 January 1949) is a Pakistani politician who was a Member of the Provincial Assembly of the Punjab, from May 2013 to May 2018.

Early life 
She was born on 1 January 1949 in Gujranwala.

Political career

She was elected to the Provincial Assembly of the Punjab as a candidate of Pakistan Muslim League (N) on a reserved seat for women in 2013 Pakistani general election.

References

Living people
Women members of the Provincial Assembly of the Punjab
Punjab MPAs 2013–2018
1949 births
Pakistan Muslim League (N) politicians
21st-century Pakistani women politicians